Chumbi Surla Wildlife Sanctuary (shortened as Chumbi Surla) is a wildlife sanctuary covering an area of . It is located in Khushab District and Chakwal District, Punjab, Pakistan. It was established in 1978, for the purpose of conserving the threatened species of urial among several other.

Habitat
The area is surrounded by reserve forests and hills. Average altitude ranges between 460-1050 m above the sea level. Temperature is between 10-40°C while average annual rainfall is 4994 mm. The forest supports scrub biome having dry subtropical evergreen vegetation.

External links
Profile at WDPA
Report by ZSD

Wildlife sanctuaries in Punjab, Pakistan
Wildlife sanctuaries of Pakistan
Protected areas established in 1978
1978 establishments in Pakistan
Protected areas of Punjab, Pakistan